Rev. Ronald V. Myers, Sr., M.D. (born February 29, 1956 – September 7, 2018) was an American physician, Baptist minister, musician, and civil rights activist. He was the founder and chairman of several organizations active in the modern movement to promote the holiday Juneteenth. He worked in the field of medicine, providing care to poor rural residents of the American South. He also performed as a jazz musician.

Personal life and education
Myers was born in Chicago, Illinois, the youngest of two sons, to Marion Mack Myers and Neoma R. Myers. The Myers family moved to Milwaukee, Wisconsin when his parents became employed as teachers in the Milwaukee Public Schools. He attended Rufus King High School in Milwaukee. He was a soloist in the high school jazz ensemble on trumpet and piano.

Myers attended the University of Wisconsin–Madison, where he majored in African American Studies and was a member of the Experimental Improvisational Black Music Ensemble, under the mentorship of trombonist and professor Jimmy Cheatham. He graduated from the University of Wisconsin Medical School in 1985 and completed his residency in Family Medicine at LSU Medical Center's Washington St. Tammany Parish Charity Hospital in Bogalusa, Louisiana in 1988. He took part-time courses at Reformed Theological Seminary at Mississippi Valley State University in 1989 and 1990.

Career 
In 1988 he and his wife opened a family health center in Tchula, Mississippi, located in an area with scarce medical resources and a high infant mortality rate. In 1990 he was ordained by Pilgrim Rest Missionary Baptist Church in Milwaukee, and commissioned by the Wisconsin Baptist Pastors Conference as a medical missionary to the Mississippi Delta.

Myers worked to bring attention to the working conditions of African-American catfish workers in the Mississippi Delta, and from 1996 to 2005 organized the annual Buffalo Fish Festival in Belzoni, Mississippi at the same time as the Catfish industry sponsored the World Catfish Festival.

In 1994 a group of community leaders from across the country gathered at Christian Unity Baptist Church in New Orleans, to work for greater national recognition of Juneteenth, a holiday celebrating the end of slavery. Myers was elected Chairman of this advocacy effort, and continues to serve as chairman of the National Juneteenth Holiday Campaign, National Juneteenth Christian Leadership Council, National Juneteenth Observance Foundation, and the National Association of Juneteenth Jazz Presenters.

In 2003, Myers organized a coalition of chronic pain patients, physicians, and patient-rights advocates, to encourage passage of the Arkansas Chronic Pain Treatment Act, through a series public marches and protest rallies in the state capitol of Little Rock. In 2004 and 2005, Myers organized marches demanding Congressional hearings on the subject.

In 2006, Myers bought the team Mississippi Stingers of the American Basketball Association. Renamed the Mississippi Miracles, the team played for one season before shutting down.

Death 
Ronald V. Myers died on September 7, 2018.

Recordings 
 Doctor's Orders (1994 ) – MOJA Records)
 Juneteenth "Free at Last" (2006) – MOJA Records)

References

External links 
National Juneteenth Observance Foundation

1956 births
2018 deaths
African-American activists
Activists for African-American civil rights
African-American Baptist ministers
African-American musicians
African-American physicians
American primary care physicians
Baptist ministers from the United States
Baptist missionaries from the United States
Baptist missionaries in the United States
Christian medical missionaries
Christians from Wisconsin
Musicians from Chicago
Religious leaders from Wisconsin
University of Wisconsin–Madison College of Letters and Science alumni
Rufus King International High School alumni
21st-century African-American people